Alevtina or occasionally Aleftina is a female given name. Notable people with the name include:

Alevtina Aparina (1941–2013), Russian politician and member of the State Duma from 1993
Alevtina Begisheva of Buranovskiye Babushki, a Russian (Udmurtian) ethno-pop band containing eight elderly women
Alevtina Biktimirova (born 1982), Russian long-distance runner who specialises in the marathon
Alevtina Fedulova (born 1940), Russian politician, member of the 1st State Duma (1993–95), chair of the Women of Russia bloc
Alevtina Ivanova (born 1975), Russian long-distance runner who specialises in the marathon
Alevtina Kolchina (born 1930), former Soviet cross-country skier
Alevtina Kovalenko (born 1980), Russian bobsledder who has competed since 2005
Alevtina Olyunina (born 1942), female Soviet former cross-country skier
Alevtina Priakhina (Pryakhina) (born 1972), Soviet former artistic gymnast
Alevtina Shtaryova (born 1997), Russian ice hockey player for Tornado Moscow and the Russian national team
Alevtina Tanygina (born 1989), Russian cross country skier

See also
Aetia (disambiguation)
Alena (disambiguation)
Aleta (disambiguation)
Altina (disambiguation)
Atina (disambiguation)

Feminine given names
Russian feminine given names